This article compares several selected client-based genealogy programs. Web-based genealogy software is not included.

General information

General features

Genealogy software products differ in the way they support data acquisition (e.g. drag and drop data entry for images, flexible data formats, free defined custom attributes for persons and connections between persons, rating of sources) and interaction (e.g. 3D-view, name filters, full text search and dynamic pan and zoom navigation), in reporting (e.g.: fan charts, automatic narratives, relationship between arbitrary people, place of birth on virtual globes, statistics about number of children per family), validation (e.g.: consistency checks, research assistants connected to online genealogy databases), exporting (e.g.: export as web page, book or wall chart) and integration (e.g.: synchronisation with tablet version). Some software might include also fun and entertainment features (e.g. quizzes or slideshows).

Get acquainted with the terms of use and privacy policy of your app provider to understand what happens with your data. For example, the Family Tree Builder by MyHeritage claims a royalty-free, worldwide, perpetual and non-exclusive license to host, copy, post and distribute your content.

Genealogical features

Besides exchange between systems (e.g. GEDCOM support for import and export), flexible data handling (e.g. custom attributes and multiple kinds of relations between people) is relevant.

Languages
Available user interface languages

Notes

References

External links
 

 
Genealogy